The Indian Council for Cultural Relations (ICCR), is an autonomous organisation of the Government of India, involved in India's global cultural relations, through cultural exchange with other countries and their people. It was founded on 9 April 1950 by Maulana Abul Kalam Azad, the first Education Minister of independent India.

The ICCR Headquarter is situated at Azad Bhavan, I.P. Estate, New Delhi, with regional offices in Bangalore, Chandigarh, Chennai, Cuttack, Goa, Guwahati, Hyderabad, Jaipur, Kolkata, Lucknow, Mumbai, Patna, Pune, Shillong, Thiruvananthapuram & Varanasi. The council also operates missions internationally, with established cultural centres in Georgetown, Paramaribo, Port Louis, Jakarta, Moscow, Valladolid, Berlin, Cairo, London (Nehru Centre, London), Tashkent, Almaty, Johannesburg, Durban, Port of Spain and Colombo. ICCR has opened new cultural centers in Dhaka, Thimpu, Sao Paulo, Kathmandu, Bangkok, Kuala Lumpur and Tokyo.

Activities

The Council addresses its mandate of cultural diplomacy through a broad range of activities. In addition to organising cultural festivals in India and overseas, the ICCR financially supports a number of cultural institutions across India, and sponsors individual performers in dance, music, photography, theatre, and the visual arts. It also administers the Jawaharlal Nehru Award for International Understanding, established by the Government of India in 1965, whose last award was in 2009.

Publications
Six quarterly journals, are published in five different languages :

References

External links

 

Cultural promotion organizations
Cultural organisations based in India
Foreign relations of India
1950 establishments in India
Government agencies established in 1950
Organisations based in Delhi
Cultural Relations
culture